Specialized Mobile Radio (SMR) may be an analog or digital trunked two-way radio system, operated by a service in the VHF, 220, UHF, 700, 800 or 900 MHz bands. Some systems with advanced features are referred to as an Enhanced Specialized Mobile Radio (ESMR). Specialized Mobile Radio is a term defined in US Federal Communications Commission (FCC) regulations. The term is of US regulatory origin but may be used in other regions to describe similar commercial systems which offer a radio communications service to businesses.

History
SMRs were created when the Federal Communications Commission began to license business and commercial 800 MHz two-way radio systems in the late 1970s.

Compatibility and purpose
Any company, such as a taxi service, towing service, or construction company, may use an SMR service. These concerns may rent radios from the SMR operator or may buy compatible radios. SMR systems use differing protocols, frequency ranges, and modulation schemes: not every radio is compatible with every SMR system. 

These systems generally consist of one or more repeaters used to maintain communications between a dispatch fleet of mobile or hand-held walkie talkie radios. One- to five-channel systems may be conventional two-way radio repeaters. More than five channel systems must be trunked.

Fees
The radio system is operated by a commercial service. Paying a fee allows users to utilize the radio system backbone, increasing their range. Some SMR systems offer telephone interconnect. This allows telephone calls to be made from the mobile radio or walkie talkie. Some systems may also offer selective calling, allowing customers to communicate with individual radios or segments of their entire radio fleet. 

Users are charged a fee for some combination of:
Air time (the amount of time any of the user's radio units is talking).
A monthly fee covering site lease costs, engineering, maintenance, and overhead.
Rental of radio units, in some cases.

Conventional two-way radio SMR system
In conventional systems, units are separated into groups by selective calling. Radios are usually segmented into customers with each customer on a separate selective calling code. Systems may use continuous tone-coded squelch system for this purpose. A disadvantage is that conventional systems require the user to disable selective calling, (to monitor,) in order to see if another company is talking before using the channel. Conventional systems are usually analog FM.

Trunked SMR system

In trunked systems, units are separated into virtual groups by the embedded radio system logic. Channel assignments are controlled by a computer and software. These virtual groups are often referred to as "fleet" and "subfleet" or "talk groups". There is no monitor function on trunked systems, but users may get busy signals or cryptic overload messages on their radio's display if an attempt is made to transmit while all channels are busy. 

A service operating an SMR system must maintain a certain number of users for each licensed channel. This is called loading. The service must show adequate loading before licenses for more channels can be granted.

Quality of service
In SMR systems, many factors affect the quality of service. This may include the capacity of the radio system versus the number of radio units using the system. A talkative user community may cause busy signals while a disciplined, professional group of SMR users may keep channels idle. 

Some systems experience seasonal peaks. For example, a trunked system in an agricultural area used by crop harvesting crews may overload and experience busy signals during peaks in harvesting. A system used by a ski resort may overload on a holiday weekend. Disaster planning experts like to say that trunked system users are likely to hear busy signals for the first time when a disaster occurs. A major flood or earthquake is likely to generate a level of call traffic that loads the system to capacity.

Siting of the system affects coverage: the system antennas should overlook the desired coverage area. Federal Communications Commission regulations require systems using the same radio frequency to be spaced 70 miles from one another or do an engineering study to confirm there will be no interference from closer spacing. 

Maintenance practices also can affect quality. In some systems, the operator may remove one channel of a trunked system from service to perform repairs. In a heavily used system, this could cause busy signals. 

Engineering documentation for these systems suggests another evaluation would be delivered audio quality. This is a measurement of the sound quality over all of the involved pieces of communications equipment from end to end. The first clue this may be an issue is that radio users with normal hearing have trouble understanding others when speaking over the radio.

See also
Business band
iDEN
 Mobile radio
 Professional Mobile Radio
 Motorola Type I trunked radio system

Notes

External links
FCC definition of Specialized Mobile Radio.
FCC PDF file describing US private radio services.

Trunked radio systems